La Paz, officially the Municipality of La Paz, is a municipality in the province of Agusan del Sur in the Caraga of the Philippines. The population was 30,969 at the 2020 census.

Geography

According to the Philippine Statistics Authority, the municipality has a land area of  constituting  of the  total area of Agusan del Sur. Which makes it the largest municipality in the Philippines in term of land area.

Climate

Barangays
La Paz is politically subdivided into 15 barangays.

Demographics

In the 2020 census, La Paz had a population of 30,969.

Economy

References

External links
 [ Philippine Standard Geographic Code]

Municipalities of Agusan del Sur